(born March 12, 1974; from Himeji, Hyōgo Prefecture) is a Japanese jockey who rode the winner of the 2006 Melbourne Cup, Delta Blues. It was Iwata's first race outside Japan.

He debuted in the Hyōgo Keiba, one of the racing organizations in National Association of Racing(NAR). He started riding on selected events in Japan Racing Association(JRA) since 2002. In 2005, Iwata won the 19th World Super Jockey Series . Despite he had not passed the written test in the past, he was allowed to transfer to JRA in the following year due to "Ankatsu's Rule".

He was awarded JRA most winning-jockey in 2011 and 2012, in races won and money earned.

Major wins
 Australia
 Melbourne Cup - (1) - Delta Blues (2006)

 Hong Kong
 Hong Kong Sprint - (2) - Lord Kanaloa (2012/2013)

 Japan
 Asahi Hai Futurity Stakes - (1) - Seiun Wonder (2008)
 February Stakes - (1) - Testa Matta (2012)
 Japan Breeding farm's Cup Classic - (1) - Time Paradox (2006)
 Japan Cup - (3) - Admire Moon (2007), Buena Vista (2011), Gentildonna (2012)
 Japan Dirt Derby - (1) - Testa Matta (2009)
 Kikuka Sho - (1) - Delta Blues (2004)
 Mile Championship - (1) - A Shin Forward (2010)
 Oka Sho - (1) - Gentildonna (2012)
 Satsuki Sho (Japanese 2000 Guineas) - (2) - Unrivaled (2009), Victoire Pisa (2010)
 Shuka Sho - (3) - Black Emblem (2008), Aventura (2011), Gentildonna (2012)
 Sprinters Stakes - (1) - Lord Kanaloa (2012)
 Takamatsunomiya Kinen - (1) - Lord Kanaloa (2013)
 Takarazuka Kinen - (1) - Admire Moon (2007)
 Tenno Sho (Spring) - (1) - Admire Jupiter (2008)
 Tokyo Daishōten - (1) - Roman Legend (2012)
 Tokyo Yushun (Japanese Derby) - (1) - Deep Brillante (2012)
 Yasuda Kinen - (2) - Vodka (2008), Lord Kanaloa (2013)

References

Japanese jockeys
1974 births
People from Himeji, Hyōgo
Living people